Rogozovka is a rural locality (a selo) and the administrative center of Rogozovsky Selsoviet of Romnensky District, Amur Oblast, Russia. The population was 291 as of 2018. There are 6 streets.

Geography 
Rogozovka is located 65 km southwest of Romny (the district's administrative centre) by road. Vysokoye is the nearest rural locality.

References 

Rural localities in Romnensky District